Vesperus creticus is a species of beetle in the Vesperidae family that is endemic to Greece.

References

Vesperidae
Beetles described in 1886
Endemic fauna of Greece
Beetles of Europe